Mansourah Mosque is a ruined historic mosque in the city of Mansourah, Algeria, dates back to the Marinid dynasty. It consists of a part of the Mansourah Castle. The excavation has revealed regarding the design of the mosque that it was built by the Sultan Abu Yakub in 1303, and the decoration of the main gate was done by Abu al-Hassan in 1336. Inside the yard there are 13 doors which surrounded by the wall, and a sahn with a fountain in the middle. The sahn is surrounded by three corridors, of which employ similar tilework with the prayer hall. The prayer hall is connected directly to the sahn and contains tilework similar to the qibla wall, the design which can be observed as well on the 13th-century Baybars Mosque in Samarra. The main entrance to the mosque leads to the iconic minaret as well, which is square-shaped, inspired by the minarets built by the Almohads in North Africa and Iberia, and reaches 38 meters.

Gallery

See also
  Lists of mosques 
  List of mosques in Africa
  List of mosques in Algeria
Tlemcen National Park
 List of cultural assets of Algeria

References

14th-century mosques
Mosques in Tlemcen
Marinid architecture